Niels Grunenberg (born 30 March 1975) is a German Paralympic swimmer. He represented Germany at the 2008 Summer Paralympics and at the 2012 Summer Paralympics and he won the silver medal in the men's 100 metres breaststroke SB5 event in 2012.

In 2013, he won the bronze medal in the men's 100 metre breaststroke SB5 event at the 2013 IPC Swimming World Championships held in Montreal, Quebec, Canada.

References

External links 
 

Living people
1975 births
Place of birth missing (living people)
German male breaststroke swimmers
Swimmers at the 2008 Summer Paralympics
Swimmers at the 2012 Summer Paralympics
Medalists at the 2012 Summer Paralympics
Paralympic silver medalists for Germany
Paralympic medalists in swimming
Paralympic swimmers of Germany
Medalists at the World Para Swimming Championships
Medalists at the World Para Swimming European Championships
S3-classified Paralympic swimmers
21st-century German people